Lamontichthys is a genus of armored catfishes native to South America.

Taxonomy
The phylogenetic position of Lamontichthys remains uncertain. It has been considered to be sister to Harttia, whereas Lamontichthys shows much more similarities with Pterosturisoma microps of the monotypic genus Pterosturisoma, which only differs from Lamontichthys by the number of pectoral fin rays.

Species
There are currently six recognized species in this genus:
 Lamontichthys avacanoeiro de Carvalho Paixão & Toledo-Piza, 2009
 Lamontichthys filamentosus (La Monte, 1935)
 Lamontichthys llanero Taphorn & Lilyestrom, 1984
 Lamontichthys maracaibero Taphorn & Lilyestrom, 1984
 Lamontichthys parakana de Carvalho Paixão & Toledo-Piza, 2009
 Lamontichthys stibaros Isbrücker & Nijssen, 1978

Distribution and habitat
Lamontichthys is distributed in the northwestern part of South America in the upper Amazon and Orinoco River drainages, and in the Lake Maracaibo region. Species in this genus occupy the same ecological niche as those of Harttia. They mainly live in the mainstream of rivers, on rocky and sandy bottoms.

Description
Sexual dimorphism in Lamontichthys includes hypertrophied odontodes on the pectoral spines in mature males. In all species of Lamontichthys, there is one pectoral fin spine and seven pectoral fin rays on each fin, as opposed to the rest of Loricariinae species which have one pectoral fin spine and only six pectoral fin rays.

Ecology
Lamontichthys is an open brooder; eggs are laid on an open surface such as rocks, submerged wood or plants, and are generally exposed to the current. Females lay a few large-sized (1.4–1.8 millimetres or .056–.071 in in diameter) yellowish eggs during each spawning event.

References

Harttiini
Fish of South America
Fish of the Amazon basin
Fish of Venezuela
Fish of Ecuador
Catfish genera
Freshwater fish genera